FC Gareji is a Georgian Association football club from Sagarejo, which currently takes part in Erovnuli Liga 2, the second tier of Georgian football league.  

The team has recently made headlines after achieving three consecutive promotions.

History

Established in 1960, during the Soviet period Gareji for many years participated in Georgian republican championship and later, after 1990, spent several seasons in the second and third divisions. 

A recent rise of the team started from Regionuli Liga in 2018. Apart from winning its Group East, Gareji also secured an easy win in a home-and-away play-off tie against their Liga 3 opponents. As members of the newly created Liga 4, they finished just below the promotion zone, which was still widely regarded as success for the debutants. Further events unfolded unexpectedly. After FC Tskhinvali failed to fulfill their financial obligations, they were expelled from Liga 3 and replaced by Gareji, who filled the vacuum as a 3rd placed team.

Against all odds, the promoted team under head coach Tengiz Kobiashvili emerged among the third division leaders from the outset of the 2020 season and convincingly prevailed over their rivals in promotion battle by winning 14 games out of 18. With this achievement Gareji completed a remarkable journey from the fifth division to Liga 2 within the shortest period of time.

Once in the second league, for most of 2021 Gareji was still aiming at the promotion, competing with Merani Martvili for a third qualifying place. Ultimately the latter gained the upper hand, although Gareji recorded some impressive victories, including 8–0, which was the biggest win of the season for any Liga 2 team. Forward Giorgi Kharebashvili shined in this match by scoring six times.

Seasons

Georgian Cup

In 2019, Gareji became a first ever 4th league team in Georgian football history to reach semifinals of the national Cup. The fact that head coach Davit Kokiashvili quit Gareji two days prior to the game may have affected the club, but they offered Lokomotive Tbilisi a decent resistance during the entire match. Despite taking the lead after the first 45 minutes, eventually Gareji lost after conceding the third goal from a penalty spot.

The next year Gareji were eliminated by Samgurali, the runners-up of the Cup.

The team reached quarterfinals in 2021 where they lost to future Cup winners Saburtalo in the dying minutes of the game.

Squad
As of 28 February 2023

Managers

 Davit Kokiashvili, March – October 2019
 Davit Maisuradze, October – December 2019
 Tengiz Kobiashvili, 2020-2021
 Kakha Gogichaishvili, January – April 2022
 Nestor Mumladze (Interim), April – May 2022
 Temur Makharadze, May – June 2022
 Davit Dighmelashvili, June – September 2022
 Giorgi Oniani, since 30 September 2022

Honours
• Regionuli Liga

Winners: 2018 (Group East D)

• Liga 4

Third place: 2019

• Meore Liga/Liga 3Winners: 2020Third place''': 2016 (Group East D)

Other teams
Gareji also have a reserve team, which participates in Group B of Regionuli Liga.

Stadium
Gareji's home arena is the Central stadium with the capacity of 2,000 seats, which sustained major reconstruction works in 2018.

References

External links
On Flashscore
On Soccerway
 On Facebook

Gareji
Association football clubs established in 1960
1960 establishments in the Soviet Union